Bonyx Yusak Saweho (born 11 November 1982) is an Indonesian boxer. He competed in the men's flyweight event at the 2004 Summer Olympics.

References

1982 births
Living people
Indonesian male boxers
Olympic boxers of Indonesia
Boxers at the 2004 Summer Olympics
Place of birth missing (living people)
Boxers at the 2002 Asian Games
Asian Games competitors for Indonesia
Flyweight boxers
21st-century Indonesian people